Peter John Twin  (born 26 July 1939 in London) is a British experimental nuclear physicist. He is known for his research into the structure  of atomic nuclei, based upon his pioneering work on techniques of gamma ray spectroscopy and, specifically, the Total Energy Suppression Shield Array (TESSA).

Education and career
Peter J. Twin graduated from the University of Liverpool with a B.Sc. in 1960 and a Ph.D. in 1964. At the University of Liverpool he became a lecturer in 1964, a Senior Lecturer in 1973, a Reader in 1979, Sir James Chadwick Professor of Experimental Physics in 1987, Lyon James Professor of Physics in 1997, and a Senior Fellow and Professor Emeritus in 2001. From 1983 to 1987 he was also Head of the Nuclear Structure Facility at the Daresbury Laboratory, which is about 30 kilometres from Liverpool. For the academic year 1968–1969 he was a visiting professor at the University of Alberta.

In 1986 his science team discovered superdeformed nuclei with a high spin (with an observation of a yrast line in the gamma spectrum). In 1991 Daniel Kleppner judged Twin's discovery of superdeformed nuclei to be one most important discoveries in physics in the years from 1986 to 1991. In retrospect, the phenomenon was also observed in 1962 when spontaneous fission of isomers in heavy nuclei was discovered by Sergey Polikanov (1926–1994).

In 1991 Twin received the John Price Wetherill Medal from the Franklin Institute. In 1991 he also won the American Physical Society's Tom W. Bonner Prize in Nuclear Physics.

Following the success of TESSA III, he collaborated with Francis Beck, director of the Centre de recherches nucléaires (CRN) at Strasbourg, on leading the French-British development of the more advanced gamma ray detectors of the Eurogam project. Eurogam I became operational in 1992 at Daresbury, and Eurogam II became operational in 1994 at Strasbourg. The detector arrays of Eurogam culminated in the EUROBALL detector array (which became operational in 1996).

Twin was made OBE in 1991 and elected in 1993 a Fellow of the Royal Society. In 2004 he was awarded, jointly with Bent Herskind, the European Physical Society's Lise Meitner Prize.

Selected publications
 
 
 
 
 
 
 
  (Flibotte collaborated with 29 co-authors, among whom is P. J. Twin.)
  (over 450 citations)

References

1937 births
Living people
Alumni of the University of Liverpool
Academics of the University of Liverpool
20th-century British physicists
21st-century British physicists
Experimental physicists
British nuclear physicists
Fellows of the Royal Society
Officers of the Order of the British Empire